The Women's sprint at the 2011 UCI Track Cycling World Championships was held on March 25 and 26. 28 athletes participated in the contest. After the qualifying heats, the fastest 24 riders advanced to the 1/16 finals.

The first rider in each of the 12 heats advanced to the second round. There was no repechage for this round.

The first rider from each of the six Second Round heats advanced to the Quarterfinals and the second placed riders advanced to a repechage to determine the other two riders that competed in the quarterfinals.

The first rider in each quarterfinal advanced to the semifinals and the 4 losing athletes raced for 5th-8th place.

The qualifying, first round, second round, second round repechages and quarterfinals took place on 25 March. The Semifinals and Finals took place on 26 March.

Results

Qualifying
The Qualifying was held at 15:25.

1/16 Finals
The 1/16 Finals were held at 16:40.

1/8 Finals
The 1/8 Finals were held at 18:30.

1/8 Finals Repechage
The 1/8 Finals Repechage were held at 19:00.

Quarterfinals
The races were held at 20:00, 20:35 and 21:10.

Race for 5th-8th Places
The race Race for 5th-8th Places was held at 21:35.

Semifinals
The Semifinals were held at 14:00, 14:40 and 15:05.

Finals
The finals were held at 15:35 and 16:00.

References

2011 UCI Track Cycling World Championships
UCI Track Cycling World Championships – Women's sprint